Kezhuvamkulam is a village in the Kottayam District in the Indian state of Kerala.

Schools

 Government L P School, Kezhuvamkulam
 NSS High School, Kezhuvamkulam

References 

Villages in Kottayam district